Gəraybəyli (also, Geraybeyli) is a village and municipality in the Ismailli Rayon of Azerbaijan.  It has a population of 786. The municipality consists of the villages of Gəraybəyli, Əyyubbəyli, and Keşxurt.

References 

Populated places in Ismayilli District